Keski-Pasila (Finnish), Mellersta Böle (Swedish) is a neighborhood of Helsinki, Finland.

Pasila